Jason Douglas Wells (born 25 March 1970) is a former New Zealand cricketer who played for the Wellington Firebirds and he also played for Wellington City which won the Hawke Cup in the 1997-98. He was born in Wellington.

References
Cricinfo: Jason Weller

1970 births
Living people
New Zealand cricketers
Wellington cricketers